The UEFA European Under-18 Championship 1973 Final Tournament was held in Italy.

Qualification

Groups 1-4

|}

Group 5

Group 6

Group 7

Group 8

Group 9

Teams
The following teams entered the tournament. Nine teams qualified (Q) and seven teams entered without playing qualification matches.

  (Q)
  (Q)
 
 
 
 
 
  (Q)
  (Q)
  (host)
  (Q)
  (Q)
  (Q)
  (Q)
  (Q)

Group stage

Group A

Group B

Group C

Group D

Semifinals

Third place match

Final

External links
Results by RSSSF

UEFA European Under-19 Championship
1973
Under-18
Under-18
UEFA European Under-18 Championship
UEFA European Under-18 Championship
UEFA European Under-18 Championship